The Hudson Review is a quarterly journal of literature and the arts.

History
It was founded in 1947 in New York, by William Arrowsmith, Joseph Deericks Bennett, and George Frederick Morgan.  The first issue was introduced in the spring of 1948.  Morgan edited the magazine from its founding until 1998, when Paula Deitz succeeded him.

According to the Review's website:  "the magazine has dealt with the area where literature bears on the intellectual life of the time and on diverse aspects of American culture. It has no university affiliation and is not committed to any narrow academic aim or to any particular political perspective."

In 2006, Princeton University libraries announced that they had acquired the archives of the journal, which included important works including an Ezra Pound manuscript.

References

External links
Official site
The Hudson Review Archives, 1863-2009 at the Princeton University Library

1947 establishments in New York (state)
Literary magazines published in the United States
Quarterly magazines published in the United States
Magazines established in 1947
Magazines published in New York City